Nehalaxmi Iyer is an Indian television actress. She is known for playing the role of Najma Ahmed Khan in Qubool Hai (2012–14) and the lead role of Saumya Kapoor in Ishqbaaaz (2016–18) and in its spin-off series Dil Boley Oberoi (2017)

She recently entered the web series arena with Qubool Hai 2.0 & Bhalla calling Bhalla on zee5

Personal life

She is born and brought up in Mumbai.

Career 
Iyer started her acting career at the age of 2 with advertisements. Her first TV show as a child artist was Banegi Apni Baat on Zee TV. She was seen in the role of Najma in Zee TV's Qubool Hai. She played Surbhi in Sasural Simar Ka on Colors.

She played Saumya, an initially main turned recurring character in Star Plus's 2016 drama Ishqbaaaz, and its spin-off Dil Boley Oberoi (2017) opposite Leenesh Mattoo.

In 2020, she guest-starred in Zee5's dramedy lockdown special show Bhalla Calling Bhalla playing the love interest to Leenesh Mattoo's character.

Filmography

Television

Web series

Award and nominations

References

External links

Living people
Indian soap opera actresses
1991 births
Indian television actresses
Indian film actresses
Actresses in Hindi television
21st-century Indian actresses